Irish singer Niall Horan has released two studio albums, one live album, three extended plays, twelve singles (including two as featured artist), one promotional single, and ten music videos. According to Recording Industry Association of America, Horan has sold 6.5 million albums and singles in the United States. Billboard ranked him as the 46th Social 50 of the 2010s decade. He was also included on Billboards Annual Year-end Top Artists of 2017, placing at number 29.

In September 2016, it was announced that Horan had signed a solo deal with Capitol Records. Later that month, Horan released his debut solo single "This Town". Since its release, it has peaked at number 9 on the UK Singles Chart, and number 20 on the US Billboard Hot 100. On 4 May 2017, Horan released his second solo single "Slow Hands". It also entered the top 10 in the UK and the top 20 in the US.

In August, Horan revealed that he had contacted Maren Morris to contribute to his song "Seeing Blind". Later the same month, he debuted a song titled "On My Own" at Dublin's Olympia Theatre. On 15 September 2017, Horan released his third single from the album, "Too Much to Ask".

Horan's debut album, Flicker, was released on 20 October 2017 under licence by Capitol Records. "On the Loose" was released as the fourth single from the album and impacted US Mainstream Top 40 radio on 20 February 2018. He released the single "Nice to Meet Ya" in October 2019. "Put a Little Love on Me" and "No Judgement" were released on 6 November 2019 and 7 February 2020, respectively. In February 2020, he announced his second studio album Heartbreak Weather, which was released on 13 March 2020.

Albums

Studio albums

Live albums

Extended plays

Singles

As lead artist

As featured artist

Promotional singles

Other charted songs

Music videos

Songwriting credits

See also
 One Direction discography

Notes

References

Discographies of Irish artists